Fianna Fáil is the largest political party in the Oireachtas. On 12 April 2011 party leader Micheál Martin appointed his second front bench, consisting of all 20 of the party's Teachtaí Dála (TDs) and one local councillor, to be spokespersons on areas corresponding to the various government departments.  This was the second front bench appointed by Martin in 10 weeks: on 31 January 2011 he had appointed a team of TDs, senators, councillors and Fianna Fáil election candidates as   party spokespersons on different issues in advance of the 2011 general election campaign.

In that campaign six sitting front bench TDs, including the deputy leader Mary Hanafin, were not re-elected. Positions also reflected the restructuring of government departments by the incoming Fine Gael-Labour Party coalition.

In May 2016 Martin announced his third front bench.

Overview
Fianna Fáil is the largest opposition party in the Dáil and therefore that party's leader takes the title Leader of the Opposition, a largely nominal role.  The other parties that occupy the opposition benches include Sinn Féin and the United Left Alliance.

The "Official Opposition" is viewed as the party tasked with keeping the government in check. It is also generally viewed as the alternative government. The Official Opposition maintains a Front bench of TDs that often have the same portfolios as actual ministers. They are known as opposition "spokespersons".

The title of "the Opposition" is held by the largest party in Dáil Éireann which is not in government, and sometimes the Opposition may even be the largest party in the Dáil.  The latter situation almost always occurred when Fianna Fáil were in opposition. This is due to the existence of the multi-party system where Fine Gael usually forms a coalition with the Labour Party.

Fianna Fáil Front Bench 2016–2020

Dáil Éireann

Seanad Éireann

Fianna Fáil Front Bench 2012–2016

See also
Fine Gael Front Bench
Green Party Front Bench
Labour Party Front Bench
Sinn Féin Front Bench

Footnotes

References

External links
Fianna Fáil spokespersons

Fianna Fáil
Front benches in the Oireachtas